Fassifern may refer to:

Fassifern, New South Wales
Fassifern, Queensland
Fassifern, Ontario
Electoral district of Fassifern, Queensland